The Handball Federation of Portugal  (FPA) is the national handball association in Portugal. FPA is a full member of the European Handball Federation (EHF) and the International Handball Federation (IHF).

The organisation oversees the national teams that represent Portugal in the international handball competitions, as well as all the club competitions within the country.

It also runs the derivate forms of the sport in Portugal, namely beach handball and adapted handball.

History 
The Handball Federation of Portugal was founded on 1 May 1939 as Federação Portuguesa de Andebol (in English, Portuguese Handball Federation), by means of the handball associations of Porto, Coimbra and Lisbon.

At first, the federation established the nationwide rules of handball in its 11-a-side variant. The 7-a-side handball was introduced in Portugal in 1949.

In 1946, FPA became one of the founding members of the International Handball Federation. Later, in 1991, FPA also became a founding member of the European Handball Federation, which succeeded the IHF.

During the first decade of the 21st century, the Federation held a legal and lobby dispute with the Liga Portuguesa de Clubes de Andebol, a short-lived independent organisation that sought to oversee the professional club handball in Portugal. Since 2008, it again became the sole governing body of handball in Portugal.

Competitions organized

Men's handball

League competitions 
 Andebol 1
 Segunda Divisão
 Terceira Divisão

Cup competitions 
 Taça de Portugal
 Super Taça

Women's handball 
 Campeonato Nacional da 1ª Divisão - Feminino
 Taça de Portugal
 Super Taça

Teams
 Portugal men's national handball team
 Portugal women's national handball team

Honours

Men's
World Men's Handball Championship
 1997 World Men's Handball Championship:19th
 2001 World Men's Handball Championship:16th
 2003 World Men's Handball Championship:12th
World Junior Championship: 3rd in 1995
European Men's Handball Championship
 1994 European Men's Handball Championship:12th
 2000 European Men's Handball Championship:7th
 2002 European Men's Handball Championship:9th
 2004 European Men's Handball Championship:14th
 2006 European Men's Handball Championship:15th
 EHF European Men's U-20: Runner-up in 2010
 EHF European Men's U-18: Winner in 1992,  Runner-up in 1994

Women's
 2008 European Women's Handball Championship:16th
EHF European Women's U-19: 4th Place

References

External links
  

Handball in Portugal
Handball
Portugal
Sports organizations established in 1939